The Poyma (called Адими Adimi until 1972) is a river in Khasansky District, Primorsky Krai, Russia.
The river rises on the southern slopes of Mount Lesozagotovitelnaya on the border with China (Black Mountains) and flows south, then bends to the southeast, finally emptying into the Baklan Bay of Peter the Great Gulf in the Sea of Japan. In its upper reaches the river has characteristics of a mountain stream. Downriver it flows through a swampy area.

Main tributaries: Malaya Poyma, Shkolnaya, Mutnaya.

References

Sources
https://web.archive.org/web/20110717225204/http://www.vladcity.com/books/online/renaming_of_place_names.pdf

Rivers of Primorsky Krai
Drainage basins of the Sea of Japan